The Altân Tepe mine (from Turkish "altın tepe", "golden hill") was a large mine in the east of Romania in Tulcea County, 63 km southwest of Tulcea and 215 km north-east of the capital, Bucharest. Altân Tepe represents the third largest copper reserve in Romania having estimated reserves of 200 million tonnes of ore grading 0.4% copper. After operation for 105 years, it was closed and conserved  in 2003 due to nonprofitability. It had also problems with water contamination.

References

External links 
 Official site

Copper mines in Romania